Conde, Condé, Condeh or Kondeh is a common surname among the Mandinka people of West Africa, and may refer to:

Alpha Condé, Guinean politician
Ibrahim Jaffa Condeh, Sierra Leonean journalist and president of the Sierra Leone journalist association
Mamady Condé, Former Guinean foreign minister
Sona Tata Condé, Guinean musician

Mandinka surnames